The château de Flawinne or Castle of Flawinne is in the Belgian village of Flawinne on the outskirts of Namur, Wallonia.

Notes

References

External links
  in the Centre de Métamusique at Castle of Flawinne

Castles in Belgium
Castles in Namur (province)